Philadelphonic is the fourth album by G. Love & Special Sauce, released in 1999.

Critical reception
Spin wrote that the album's "beach-bound grooves are well-trodden." Entertainment Weekly called it "sleeker and more streamlined than its three predecessors." The Washington Post called Philadelphonic the band's best album, writing that it "achieves a flow so smooth that one can't tell where the Bob Dylan influences stop and the Eric B. & Rakim influences start."

Track listing
"No Turning Back" (G. Love & Special Sauce and BRODEEVA) – 3:03
"Dreamin'" (G. Love, Clarence Reid, Wilie Clarke) – 3:54
 Contains a sample from "Clean Up Woman" performed by Betty Wright
"Roaches" (G. Love & Special Sauce and Jake Joys) – 1:10
"Rodeo Clowns" (Jack Johnson) – 2:57
"Numbers" (G. Love) – 4:24
"Relax" (G. Love) – 4:15
"Do It for Free" (G. Love & Special Sauce and BRODEEVA) – 5:02
"Honor and Harmony" (G. Love) – 3:36
"Kick Drum" (G. Love & Special Sauce and BRODEEVA) – 2:23
"Friday Night" (G. Love, Jimi "Jazz" Prescott) – 4:09
"Rock and Roll" (G. Love & Special Sauce – 3:08
"Love" (G. Love, T-Ray) – 3:39
"Around the World (Thank You)" (G. Love & Special Sauce – 1:27
"Gimme Some Lovin'" (G. Love) – 2:23
 After five minutes of silence, an unlisted track, "Amazing," begins.

Personnel
G. Love - lead vocals, guitar, and harmonica
Jeffrey Clemens - percussion and background vocals
Jimi "Jazz" Prescott - string bass
Jack Johnson - acoustic guitar and vocals
Mike Tyler - guitar
Anton Pukshansky - organ, clavinette, and guitar
DJ Roman - scratches
David Gellar - percussion
T-Ray - beats
BRODEEVA (Chad Howlett & Earl Bryant, Jr) - vocals

References

External links
G. Love & Special Sauce Official site

G. Love & Special Sauce albums
1999 albums